Cleveland is an unincorporated community in Webster County, West Virginia, United States. Cleveland has a post office with ZIP code 26215.

History
Over the years, the village now known as Cleveland has had three different names: Buffalo Fork, Point, and Cleveland. This reflected the change in name assigned to the post office located in the community. The first post office was established in 1853 and was named Buffalo Fork, after the small nearby stream that flows into the right fork of the Little Kanawha River.

Thirty years later in 1883, the post office was dubbed "Point" simply because a shorter name was preferred for postal purposes. Point, however, was short-lived, as two years later, in 1885; the post office name was changed to Cleveland, in honor of Grover Cleveland, who was just beginning his first term as President of the United States.

References

Unincorporated communities in Webster County, West Virginia
Unincorporated communities in West Virginia